Baby-Towarzystwo  is a village in the administrative district of Gmina Dąbrowice, within Kutno County, Łódź Voivodeship, in central Poland.

The village has a population of 370.

References

Baby-Towarzystwo